The 1943 Copa Adrián C. Escober Final was the match that decided the winner of the fourth edition of the Copa Adrián C. Escobar, an Argentine domestic cup organised by the Argentine Football Association. The match was contested by Club Atlético Huracán, which played its third consecutive final, and Club Atlético Platense.

The final was held in San Lorenzo Stadium on December 11, 1943. After the match ended tied 0–0, Huracán was declared winner 4–1 based on a penalty shootout. Huracán won its second Copa Escobar trophy.

Qualified teams

Overview 
This edition of the Cup was contested by the seven best placed teams of the 1943 Primera División season. Boca Juniors, as champions, advanced directly to semifinals. The matches only lasted 40 minutes (two halves of 20' each), with some teams playing two games a day. River Plate and San Lorenzo stadiums were the venues of the competition.

In the tournament, Huracán beat River Plate 1–0 and Independiente (on penalties awarded) at Estadio Monumental. Platense beat Estudiantes de La Plata 1–0 (at Estadio Monumental) and Boca Juniors in semifinals (7–3 on penalties after a 1–1 draw) at San Lorenzo Stadium.

Match details

References

e
1943 in Argentine football
Football in Buenos Aires